Joel Carmichael (December 31, 1915 – January 27, 2006) was an American historian, magazine editor, and translator.

Biography

Early life and education
Born Joel Lipsky on December 31, 1915, in New York City, Carmichael was the youngest son of Charlotte Schacht and Louis Lipsky, a founder of the American Zionist movement, President of the Zionist Organization of America. His oldest brother, David (1907–1996) became a publicist; his middle brother, Eleazar (1911–1993), was a lawyer, novelist, journalist, playwright and active Zionist.

Following graduation from high school, he was sent for a year to Palestine. There he began learning Arabic before returning to New York and attending Columbia University. In England, a chance meeting with an Oxford don turned him to read Greek and Russian at Oxford.

Career
His first book, a translation of a memoir of the Russian Revolution, helped Carmichael land a contract with Oxford University Press. From there, he wrote numerous titles on early Christianity, Arab history and Russian history, and translated Anna Karenina for a new paperback edition. One book, The Death of Jesus, was translated into eight languages. Carmichael was also editor of Midstream, a Zionist magazine, for 24 years, serving from 1975–1988 and 1990-2001.

Marriage and family
Carmichael was married twice: first to the journalist Mary Carr Thomas, then to sculptor Elizabeth de Cuevas in 1960. He had three children.

His granddaughter is the filmmaker Emily Carmichael.

Death
Carmichael died January 27, 2006, in Manhattan.

Published works
An Illustrated History of Russia (Reynal, 1960)
The Eichmann Case: Reactions in West Germany (Marstin Press, 1961)
Chaim Weizmann: A Biography by Several Hands with Meyer Wolfe Weisgal and David Ben-Gurion (1962)
The Death of Jesus (Macmillan, 1963)
A Short History of the Russian Revolution (Nelson, 1964)
The Shaping of the Arabs: A Study in Ethnic Identity (Macmillan, 1967)
Karl Marx: The Passionate Logician (Scribner, 1967)
Open Letter to Moses and Mohammed (J.H. Heineman, 1968)
A Cultural History of Russia (Weybright and Talley, 1968)
Trotsky: an Appreciation of His Life (St. Martin's Press, 1975)
Stalin's Masterpiece (St. Martin's Press, 1976)
Arabs Today (Anchor Press/Doubleday, 1977)
The Birth of Christianity: Reality and Myth (Hippocrene Books, 1989)
A History of Russia (Hippocrene Books, 1990)
The Satanizing of the Jews: Origin and Development of Mystical Anti-Semitism (Fromm International Pub. Corp., 1992)
The Unriddling of Christian Origins: A Secular Account (Prometheus Books, 1995)

Translations
Carl Brockelmann, History of the Islamic Peoples (G.P. Putnam's Sons, 1939)
N. N. Sukhanov, The Russian Revolution: A Personal Record (Oxford, 1955)
Leo Tolstoy, Anna Karenina (Bantam, 1960)
Dan Theodore, The Origins of Bolshevism (Secker & Warburg, 1964)
Gisela Elsner, The Giant Dwarfs (Grove Press, 1965)
Paul Marc Henry, Africa Aeterna: The Pictorial Chronicle of a Continent (Sedo S.A., 1965)
Jean Lacouture, Vietnam: Between Two Truces, trans. w. Kellen Konrad (Vintage Books/Random House, 1966)
Willy Brandt, A Peace Policy for Europe (Holt, Rinehart & Winston, 1968)

See also
List of Islamic scholars

References

External links
Lipsky Family Papers; P-858; American Jewish Historical Society, Boston, MA and New York, NY.
http://www.imdb.com/name/nm0138438/
http://www.nybooks.com/authors/1261

1915 births
2006 deaths
American magazine editors
French–English translators
German–English translators
Historians of Russia
Jewish American historians
Russian–English translators
20th-century American historians
20th-century American translators
20th-century American male writers
American male non-fiction writers
20th-century American Jews
21st-century American Jews